The Twelfth Tripura Assembly (Twelfth Vidhan Sabha of Tripura) were formed by the members elected in the 2018 Tripura Legislative Assembly election. Elections were held in 59 constituencies of the state on 18 February 2018. Votes were counted on 3 March 2018.

Party Wise Distribution of Seats

Members 
Source:

References

Tripura Legislative Assembly